Hubert Carlisle Pilkington (23 October 1879 – 17 June 1942) was an English first-class cricketer active 1899–1904 who played for Middlesex and Oxford University. He was born in Liverpool, educated at Eton College and Magdalen College, Oxford, and died in Letchworth.

References

1879 births
1967 deaths
English cricketers
Middlesex cricketers
Oxford University cricketers
People educated at Eton College
Alumni of Magdalen College, Oxford
Oxford University Past and Present cricketers